Brick Presbyterian Church may refer to:

Brick Presbyterian Church (New York City)
Old Brick Church (New York City), the former building of Brick Presbyterian Church (New York City)
Brick Presbyterian Church (Perry, New York)
Brick Presbyterian Church Complex (Rochester, New York)

See also
Brick Church (disambiguation)
Old Brick Church (Iowa City, Iowa), once known as First Presbyterian or North Presbyterian
Brick Chapel Church and Cemetery, Canton, New York, a historic Presbyterian church and cemetery 
Cove Presbyterian Church, Wytheville, Virginia, also known as Cove Brick Church
Crockett's Cove Presbyterian Church
Old Brick Church (Fairfield County, South Carolina), also known as Ebenezer Associate Reformed Presbyterian Church
Salem Black River Presbyterian Church, Sumter, South Carolina, also known as Brick Church